Quercus wislizeni, known by the common name interior live oak, is an evergreen oak, highly variable and often shrubby, found in many areas of California in the United States continuing south into northern Baja California in Mexico. It generally occurs in foothills, being most abundant in the lower elevations of the Sierra Nevada, but also widespread in the Pacific Coast Ranges—where since 1980 it has been known as a separate species Quercus parvula—and the San Gabriel Mountains. It was named for its collector, Friedrich Adolph Wislizenus (1810–1889).

Description

The male flowers are on catkins, the female flowers in leaf axils.

Nomenclature

Although originally published by Alphonse Pyramus de Candolle as "wislizeni", some sources, e.g., Jensen in Flora of North America, mistakenly spelled the specific epithet "wislizenii." Correct spelling is with one "i," per ICN article 60C.2. Wislizenus' specimen was thought by de Candolle to have been collected in Chihuahua, Mexico. However, German-born American botanist Georg Engelmann later corrected the location to the American fork of the Sacramento River near Auburn, California.

California physician and botanist (and one of the founding fathers of the California Academy of Sciences) Albert Kellogg described an oak in an 1855 publication as Quercus arcoglandis (spur acorn oak), apparently the same species as Q. wislizeni. This clearly predates French-Swiss botanist de Candolle's 1864 name, and if confirmed to be this same taxon would have priority. More investigation is needed to resolve this taxonomic conflict.

Currently there are two recognized varieties of interior live oak:
 Q. wislizeni A. DC. var. wislizeni (1864)
 Q. wislizeni A. DC. var. frutescens Engelm (1878). This is an invalid taxon. Engelmann's Q. wislizeni var. frutescens description is virtually identical to de Candolle's Q. wislizeni, while Engelmann's Q. wislizeni description most closely matches Kellogg's Q. morehus.

Ecology
The interior live oak is a red oak (section Lobatae) in the California Floristic Province (series Agrifoliae). Q. wislizeni hybridizes with California black oak (Q. kelloggii) (= Quercus × morehus, Abram's oak). All California red oaks show evidence of introgression and/or hybridization with one another.

A common alliant tree is gray pine (Pinus sabiniana).

Deer browse the tree's foliage.

Uses
Humans use the wood as a fuel source.

References

Bibliography

External links

 C. Michael Hogan (2008) California Buckeye: Aesculus californica, GlobalTwitcher.com, N. Stromberg ed.

wislizeni
Trees of Baja California
Flora of California
Natural history of the California chaparral and woodlands
Natural history of the California Coast Ranges
Natural history of the Peninsular Ranges
Natural history of the San Francisco Bay Area
Natural history of the Santa Monica Mountains
Natural history of the Transverse Ranges
Plants described in 1864
Trees of Mediterranean climate
Garden plants of North America
Drought-tolerant trees
Oaks of Mexico